Kalima Amankulova (born 1915) was a Soviet Kyrgyz politician. She was Chairman of the Supreme Soviet of the Kirghiz Soviet Socialist Republic in 1938.  Her office as Chairman of the Supreme Soviet nominally made her "Head of the Republic".

See also
Politics of Kyrgyzstan

References 

1915 births
Possibly living people
Soviet politicians
20th-century Kyrgyzstani politicians
Soviet women in politics
20th-century Kyrgyzstani women politicians
First convocation members of the Soviet of Nationalities